Natasha Rothwell is an American writer and actress.

Career
Rothwell taught for KIPP NYC and went on to work at Saturday Night Live (SNL). She first garnered attention as a writer on SNL in the 2014–2015 season. She gained further fame through working on the HBO television series Insecure. On Insecure, she works as a writer, series regular, and supervising producer. In 2018 she was reportedly developing, writing, and executive producing another show for HBO, in which she would also star.

On April 15, 2019, Rothwell joined a host of other writers in firing their agents as part of the Writers Guild of America’s stand against the Association of Talent Agents and the practice of packaging. More recently, her company Big Hattie Productions struck an overall deal with ABC Signature.

In 2022, Rothwell was nominated for a Primetime Emmy Award for Outstanding Supporting Actress in a Limited or Anthology Series or Movie for her work in HBO's The White Lotus.

Filmography

Film

Television

Awards and nominations

Notes

References

External links
 

Living people
American women writers
African-American actresses
American women comedians
Writers from Wichita, Kansas
African-American female comedians
American voice actresses
21st-century African-American people
21st-century African-American women
20th-century African-American people
20th-century African-American women